County Road 820 is a  road in the municipalities of Bø, Øksnes, and Sortland in Nordland County, Norway. It starts in the village of Straumsnes in the municipality of Bø, where it continues south from County Road 901, circles around the west end of the island of Langøya through the Straume Nature Reserve to the village of Straume, and continues east to the Ryggedal Tunnel. It then passes through the municipality of Øksnes along the west shore of Ånnfjord and south shore of Skjellfjord before entering the municipality of Sortland. There it passes along the inner shore of Eidsfjord through Frøskeland, crosses Vikeid (the Vik Isthmus), where County Road 956 branches off to Vik, and then runs past the southwest shore of the Vikosen Nature Reserve and along the west side of Sortlandssundet strait, where it terminates at the town of Sortland.

Prior to January 1, 2010, the route was a national road. After the national road network regional reform came into force, the route was reassigned the status of a county road.

References

External links
Statens vegvesen – trafikkmeldinger Fv820 (Traffic Information: County Road 820)

820
Nordland